

DeKalb County Central United School District 
Country Meadow Elementary School
James R. Watson Elementary School
McKenney-Harrison Elementary School
Waterloo Elementary School
DeKalb Middle School
DeKalb High School

DeKalb County Eastern Community School District 
Butler Elementary School
Riverdale Elementary School
Eastside Junior-Senior High School

Garrett-Keyser-Butler Community School District 
J. E. Ober Elementary School
Garrett Middle School
Garrett Junior-Senior High School
 St. Joseph Catholic School

Hamilton Community Schools 
Hamilton Elementary School
Hamilton Junior-Senior High School

Private schools
Lakewood Park Christian School (Auburn)
St. Joseph's Catholic School (Garrett)

External links 
DeKalb County Central United School District
DeKalb County Eastern Community School District
Garrett-Keyser-Butler Community School District
Hamilton Community Schools
Lakewood Park Christian School

Schools in DeKalb County, Indiana
DeKalb County